Notkin is the surname of:

 David Notkin (1955–2013), software engineer 
 Geoffrey Notkin (born 1961), author and meteorite hunter 
 Richard T. Notkin (born 1948), ceramic artist